Vice Admiral Donato Marzano is an Italian Naval officer currently serving as Commander in Chief Naval Fleet.

He joined the Navy in 1975 and graduated from the Naval Academy in 1978. He served on surface ships and commanded the Mine Hunter ITS Lerici and commanded Luigi Durand De La Penne during Operation Enduring Freedom. He served as the Chief the General Office of the Chief of Defence from 31 January 2013 to 27 February 2015.

He served as Head of Logistics Command from 4 March 2015  till September 2016 when he was appointed Commander in Chief Naval Fleet.

References

Italian admirals
1956 births
Living people
People from Taranto